The 1880 United States presidential election in Nebraska took place on November 2, 1880, as part of the 1880 United States presidential election. Voters chose three representatives, or electors to the Electoral College, who voted for president and vice president.

Nebraska voted for the Republican nominee, James A. Garfield, over the Democratic nominee, Winfield Scott Hancock. Garfield won the state by a margin of 30.25%.

With 62.87% of the popular vote, Nebraska would be Garfield's second strongest victory in terms of percentage in the popular vote after Vermont.

Results

Results by county

See also
 United States presidential elections in Nebraska

Notes

References

Nebraska
1880
1880 Nebraska elections